A double negative is a construction occurring when two forms of grammatical negation are used in the same sentence. Multiple negation is the more general term referring to the occurrence of more than one negative in a clause. In some languages, double negatives cancel one another and produce an affirmative; in other languages, doubled negatives intensify the negation. Languages where multiple negatives affirm each other are said to have negative concord or emphatic negation. Portuguese, Persian, French, Russian, Greek, Spanish, Old English, Italian, Afrikaans, Hebrew are examples of negative-concord languages. This is also true of many vernacular dialects of modern English. Chinese, Latin, German, Dutch, Japanese, Swedish and modern Standard English are examples of languages that do not have negative concord. Typologically, it occurs in a minority of languages.

Languages without negative concord typically have negative polarity items that are used in place of additional negatives when another negating word already occurs.  Examples are "ever", "anything" and "anyone" in the sentence "I haven't ever owed anything to anyone" (cf. "I haven't never owed nothing to no one" in negative-concord dialects of English, and "" in Portuguese, lit. "Never have I owed nothing to no one", or "" in Italian).  Negative polarity can be triggered not only by direct negatives such as "not" or "never", but also by words such as "doubt" or "hardly" ("I doubt he has ever owed anything to anyone" or "He has hardly ever owed anything to anyone").

Because standard English does not have negative concord but many varieties and registers of English do, and because most English speakers can speak or comprehend across varieties and registers, double negatives as collocations are functionally auto-antonymic (contranymic) in English; for example, a collocation such as "ain't nothin" or "not nothing" can mean either "something" or "nothing", and its disambiguation is resolved via the contexts of register, variety, locution, and content of ideas. 

Stylistically, in English, double negatives can sometimes be used for affirmation (e.g. "I'm not feeling unwell"), an  understatement of the positive ("I'm feeling well").  The rhetorical term for this is litotes.

English

Two negatives resolving to a positive
When two negatives are used in one independent clause, in standard English the negatives are understood to cancel one another and produce a weakened affirmative (see the Robert Lowth citation below): this is known as litotes. However, depending on how such a sentence is constructed, in some dialects if a verb or adverb is in between two negatives then the latter negative is assumed to be intensifying the former thus adding weight or feeling to the negative clause of the sentence. For this reason, it is difficult to portray double negatives in writing as the level of intonation to add weight in one's speech is lost. A double negative intensifier does not necessarily require the prescribed steps, and can easily be ascertained by the mood or intonation of the speaker. Compare
 There isn't no other way.
= There's some other way. Negative: isn't (is not), no
versus
 There isn't no other way!
= There's no other way!
These two sentences would be different in how they are communicated by speech. Any assumption would be correct, and the first sentence can be just as right or wrong in intensifying a negative as it is in cancelling it out; thereby rendering the sentence's meaning ambiguous. Since there is no adverb or verb to support the latter negative, the usage here is ambiguous and lies totally on the context behind the sentence. In light of punctuation, the second sentence can be viewed as the intensifier; and the former being a statement thus an admonishment.

In Standard English, two negatives are understood to resolve to a positive. This rule was observed as early as 1762, when Bishop Robert Lowth wrote A Short Introduction to English Grammar with Critical Notes. For instance, "I don't disagree" could mean "I certainly agree",  "I agree", "I sort of agree", "I don't understand your point of view (POV)", "I have no opinion", and so on; it is a form of "weasel words". Further statements are necessary to resolve which particular meaning was intended.

This is opposed to the single negative "I don't agree", which typically means "I disagree". However,  the statement "I don't completely disagree" is a similar double negative to "I don't disagree" but needs little or no clarification.

With the meaning "I completely agree", Lowth would have been referring to litotes wherein two negatives simply cancel each other out. However, the usage of intensifying negatives and examples are presented in his work, which could also imply he wanted either usage of double negatives abolished. Because of this ambiguity, double negatives are frequently employed when making back-handed compliments. The phrase "Mr. Jones wasn't incompetent." will seldom mean "Mr. Jones was very competent" since the speaker would've found a more flattering way to say so. Instead, some kind of problem is implied, though Mr. Jones possesses basic competence at his tasks.

Two or more negatives resolving to a negative

Discussing English grammar, the term "double negative" is often, though not universally, applied to the non-standard use of a second negative as an intensifier to a negation.

Double negatives are usually associated with regional and ethnical dialects such as Southern American English, African American Vernacular English, and various British regional dialects. Indeed, they were used in Middle English: for example, Chaucer made extensive use of double, triple, and even quadruple negatives in his Canterbury Tales. About the Friar, he writes "" ("There never was no man nowhere so virtuous"). About the Knight, "" ("He never yet no vileness didn't say / In all his life to no manner of man").

Following the battle of Marston Moor, Oliver Cromwell quoted his nephew's dying words in a letter to the boy's father Valentine Walton: "A little after, he said one thing lay upon his spirit. I asked him what it was. He told me it was that God had not suffered him to be no more the executioner of His enemies." Although this particular letter has often been reprinted, it is frequently changed to read "not ... to be any more" instead.

Whereas some double negatives may resolve to a positive, in some dialects others resolve to intensify the negative clause within a sentence. For example:
 I didn't go nowhere today.
 I'm not hungry no more.
 You don't know nothing.
 There was never no more laziness at work than before.

In contrast, some double negatives become positives:
 I didn't not go to the park today.
 We can't not go to sleep!
 This is something you can't not watch.

The key to understanding the former examples and knowing whether a double negative is intensive or negative is finding a verb between the two negatives. If a verb is present between the two, the latter negative becomes an intensifier which does not negate the former.  In the first example, the verb to go separates the two negatives; therefore the latter negative does not negate the already negated verb.  Indeed, the word 'nowhere' is thus being used as an adverb and does not negate the argument of the sentence. Double negatives such as I don't want to know no more contrast with Romance languages such as French in Je ne veux pas savoir.

An exception is when the second negative is stressed, as in I'm not doing ; I'm thinking.  A sentence can otherwise usually only become positive through consecutive uses of negatives, such as those prescribed in the later examples, where a clause is void of a verb and lacks an adverb to intensify it.  Two of them also use emphasis to make the meaning clearer. The last example is a popular example of a double negative that resolves to a positive. This is because the verb 'to doubt' has no intensifier which effectively resolves a sentence to a positive. Had we added an adverb thus:
 I never had no doubt this sentence is false.

Then what happens is that the verb to doubt becomes intensified, which indeed deduces that the sentence is indeed false since nothing was resolved to a positive. The same applies to the third example, where the adverb 'more' merges with the prefix no- to become a negative word, which when combined with the sentence's former negative only acts as an intensifier to the verb hungry. Where people think that the sentence I'm not hungry no more resolves to a positive is where the latter negative no becomes an adjective which only describes its suffix counterpart more which effectively becomes a noun, instead of an adverb. This is a valid argument since adjectives do indeed describe the nature of a noun; yet some fail to take into account that the phrase no more is only an adverb and simply serves as an intensifier. Another argument used to support the position double negatives aren't acceptable is a mathematical analogy: negating a negative number results in a positive one; e.g., ; therefore, it is argued, I did not go nowhere resolves to I went somewhere.

Other forms of double negatives, which are popular to this day and do strictly enhance the negative rather than destroying it, are described thus:

I'm not entirely familiar with Nihilism nor Existentialism.

Philosophies aside, this form of double negative is still in use whereby the use of 'nor' enhances the negative clause by emphasizing what isn't to be. Opponents of double negatives would have preferred I'm not entirely familiar with Nihilism or Existentialism; however this renders the sentence somewhat empty of the negative clause being advanced in the sentence. This form of double negative along with others described are standard ways of intensifying as well as enhancing a negative. The use of 'nor' to emphasise the negative clause is still popular today, and has been popular in the past through the  works of Shakespeare and Milton:

Nor did they not perceive the evil plight
In which they were ~ John Milton - Paradise Lost

I never was, nor never will be ~ William Shakespeare - Richard III

The negatives herein do not cancel each other out but simply emphasize the negative clause.

Up to the 18th century, double negatives were used to emphasize negation. "Prescriptive grammarians" recorded and codified a shift away from the double negative in the 1700s. Double negatives continue to be spoken by those of Vernacular English, such as those of Appalachian English and African American Vernacular English. To such speakers, they view double negatives as emphasizing the negative rather than cancelling out the negatives. Researchers have studied African American Vernacular English (AAVE) and trace its origins back to colonial English. This shows that double negatives were present in colonial English, and thus presumably English as a whole, and were acceptable at that time. English after the 18th century was changed to become more logical and double negatives became seen as canceling each other as in mathematics. The use of double negatives became associated with being uneducated and illogical.

In his Essay towards a practical English Grammar of 1711, James Greenwood first recorded the rule: "Two Negatives, or two Adverbs of Denying do in English affirm". Robert Lowth stated in his grammar textbook A Short Introduction to English Grammar (1762) that "two negatives in English destroy one another, or are equivalent to an affirmative". Grammarians have assumed that Latin was the model for Lowth and other early grammarians in prescribing against negative concord, as Latin does not feature it.  Data indicates, however, that negative concord had already fallen into disuse in Standard English by the time of Lowth's grammar, and no evidence exists that the loss was driven by prescriptivism, which was well established by the time it appeared.

In film and TV

Double negatives have been employed in various films and television shows. In the film Mary Poppins (1964), the chimney sweep Bert employs a double negative when he says, "If you don't wanna go nowhere..." Another is used by the bandits in the "Stinking Badges" scene of John Huston's The Treasure of the Sierra Madre (1948): "Badges? We ain't got no badges. We don't need no badges!."

The Simpsons episode "Hello Gutter, Hello Fadder" (1999) features Bart writing "I won't not use no double negatives" (pictured) as part of the opening sequence chalkboard gag. More recently, the British television show EastEnders has received some publicity over the Estuary accent of character Dot Branning, who speaks with double and triple negatives ("I ain't never heard of no licence.").. In the Harry Enfield sketch "Mr Cholmondley-Warner's Guide to the Working-Class", a stereotypical Cockney employs a septuple-negative: "Inside toilet? I ain't never not heard of one of them nor I ain't nor nothing."

In music, double negatives can be employed to similar effect (as in Pink Floyd's "Another Brick in the Wall", in which schoolchildren chant "We don't need no education / We don't need no thought control") or used to establish a frank and informal tone (as in The Rolling Stones' "(I Can't Get No) Satisfaction"). Other examples include Ain't Nobody (Chaka Khan), Ain't No Sunshine (Bill Withers), and Ain't No Mountain High Enough (Marvin Gaye)

Other Germanic languages
Double negation is uncommon in other West Germanic languages. A notable exception is Afrikaans in which it is mandatory (for example, "He cannot speak Afrikaans" becomes Hy kan nie Afrikaans praat nie, "He cannot Afrikaans speak not"). Dialectal Dutch, French and San have been suggested as possible origins for this trait. Its proper use follows a set of fairly complex rules as in these examples provided by Bruce Donaldson:
  ("I did not know that he would be coming.")
  ("I knew that he would not be coming.")
  ("He will not be coming because he is sick.")
  ("It is not so difficult to learn Afrikaans.")

Another point of view is that the construction is not really an example of a "double negative" but simply a grammatical template for negation. The second  cannot be understood as a noun or adverb (unlike  in French, for example), and it cannot be substituted by any part of speech other than itself with the sentence remaining grammatical.  The grammatical particle has no independent meaning and happens to be spelled and pronounced the same as the embedded , meaning "not", by a historical accident.

The second  is used if and only if the sentence or phrase does not already end with either  or another negating adverb.
  ("I don't see you")
  ("I never see you")

Afrikaans shares with English the property that two negatives make a positive:
  ("I don't agree with you." )
  ("I don't not agree with you," i.e., I agree with you.)

Double negation is still found in the Low Franconian dialects of west Flanders (e.g., "I do not want to do that") and in some villages in the central Netherlands such as Garderen, but it takes a different form than that found in Afrikaans. Belgian Dutch dialects, however, still have some widely-used expressions like  ("never not") for "never".

Like some dialects of English, Bavarian has both single and double negation, with the latter denoting special emphasis. For example, the Bavarian  ("This have I yet never not heard") can be compared to the Standard German "". The German emphatic "" (roughly "never ever") corresponds to Bavarian "" or even "" in the Standard German pronunciation.

Another exception is Yiddish for which Slavic influence causes the double (and sometimes even triple) negative to be quite common.

A few examples would be:
  ("I never didn't say")
  ("I have no fear of no one not")
 It is common to add  ("not") after the Yiddish word  ("nothing"), i.e.  ("I haven't said nothing")

Latin and Romance languages
In Latin a second negative word appearing along with  turns the meaning into a positive one:  means "any",  means "no", means "some". In the same way,  means "ever",  means "never",  means "sometimes". In many Romance languages a second term indicating a negative is required.

In Northern Catalan,  may be omitted in colloquial language, and Occitan, which uses  only as a short answer to questions. These exemplify Jespersen's cycle.

The Spanish, Italian, Portuguese and Romanian languages usually employ doubled negative correlatives. Portuguese , Spanish , Romanian  and Italian  (literally, "I do not see nothing") are used to express "I do not see anything". In Italian, a second following negative particle  turns the phrase into a positive one, but with a slightly different meaning.

Other Romance languages employ double negatives less regularly. This practice is dying out.

Welsh

Negative correlatives can also occur with already negative verb forms. This is not usually regarded as three negative markers, however, because the negative mutation is really just an effect of the initial particle on the following word.

Greek

Ancient Greek
Doubled negatives are perfectly correct in Ancient Greek.  With few exceptions, a simple negative (οὐ or μή) following another negative (for example, no one) results in an affirmation:  ("No one was not suffering") means more simply "Everyone was suffering". Meanwhile, a compound negative following a negative strengthens the negation:  ("Do not permit no one to raise an uproar") means "Let not a single one among them raise an uproar".

Those constructions apply only when the negatives all refer to the same word or expression. Otherwise, the negatives simply work independently of one another:  means "It was not on account of their not throwing that they did not hit him", and one should not blame them for not trying.

Modern Greek
In Modern Greek, a double negative can express either an affirmation or a negation, depending on the word combination. When expressing negation, it usually carries an emphasis with it. Native speakers can usually understand the sentence meaning from the voice tone and the context.

Examples

We can find it.

We can find it.

Slavic languages
In Slavic languages, multiple negatives affirm each other. Indeed, if a sentence contains a negated verb, any indefinite pronouns or adverbs must be used in their negative forms. In Bulgarian, it is:  [], lit. "I don't know nothing". In Russian, "I know nothing" is  [], lit. "I don't know nothing".

Negating the verb without negating the pronoun (or vice versa), while syntactically correct, may result in a very unusual meaning or make no sense at all. Saying "I saw nobody" in Polish instead of the more usual "I did not see nobody" might mean "I saw an instance of nobody" or "I saw Mr Nobody" but it would not have its plain English meaning. Likewise, in Slovenian, saying "I do not know anyone" in place of "I do not know no one" has the connotation "I do not know just anyone: I know someone important or special."

In Czech, like in many other languages, a standard double negative is used in sentences with a negative pronoun or negative conjunction, where the verb is also negated ( "nobody came", literally "nobody didn't come"). However, this doubleness is also transferred to forms where the verbal copula is released and the negation is joined to the nominal form, and such a phrase can be ambiguous:  ("nobody unscathed") can mean both "nobody healthy" and "all healthy". The sentence,  ("all don't were there") means not "all absented" but "there were not all" (= "at least one of them absenteed"). If all absented, it should be said  ("nobody weren't there"). However, in many cases, a double, triple quadruple negative can really work in such a way that each negative cancels out the next negative, and such a sentence may be a catch and may be incomprehensible to a less attentive or less intelligent addressee. E.g. the sentence,  ("I can't never not indulge in inaction") contains 4 negations and it is very confusing which of them create a "double negative" and which of them eliminated from each other. Such confusing sentences can then diplomatically soften or blur rejection or unpleasant information or even agreement, but at the expense of intelligibility:  ("it can't be not seen"),  ("I'm not dissatisfied"),  ("it/he is not uninteresting"),  ("I can't disagree").

Baltic languages
As with most synthetic satem languages double negative is mandatory in Latvian and Lithuanian. Furthermore, all verbs and indefinite pronouns in a given statement must be negated, so it could be said that multiple negative is mandatory in Latvian.

The only alternative would be using a negating subordinate clause and subjunctive in the main clause, which could be approximated in English as "there has not ever been an instance that I would have owed anything to anyone", where negative pronouns are replaced by indefinite pronouns more in line with the English "ever, any" indefinite pronoun structures.

Uralic languages
Double or multiple negatives are grammatically required in Hungarian with negative pronouns:  (word for word: "[doesn't-exists] [nothing-of-mine]", and translates literally as "I do not have nothing") means "I do not have anything". Negative pronouns are constructed by means of adding the prefixes se-, sem-, and sen- to interrogative pronouns.

Something superficially resembling double negation is required also in Finnish, which uses the auxiliary verb  to express negation. Negative pronouns are constructed by adding one of the suffixes -an, -än, -kaan, or -kään to interrogative pronouns:  means "No one called me".

Turkish

Negative verb forms are grammatically required in Turkish phrases with negative pronouns or adverbs that impart a negative meaning on the whole phrase. For example,  (literally, word for word, "Not-one thing-of-mine exists-not") means "I don't have anything". Likewise,  (literally, "Never satisfied not-I-am") means "I'm never satisfied".

Japanese
Japanese employs litotes to phrase ideas in a more indirect and polite manner. Thus, one can indicate necessity by emphasizing that not doing something would not be proper. For instance,  ("must", more literally "if not done, [can] not be") means "not doing [it] wouldn't be proper".  (also "must", "if not done, can not go') similarly means "not doing [it] can't go forward".

Of course, indirectness can also be employed to put an edge on one's rudeness as well. Whilst "He has studied Japanese, so he should be able to write kanji" can be phrased , there is a harsher idea in it: "As he's studied Japanese, the reasoning that he can't write Kanji doesn't exist".

Chinese
Mandarin Chinese and most Chinese languages also employ litotes in a likewise manner. One common construction is "" (Pinyin: , "mustn't not" or "shalln't not"), which is used to express (or feign) a necessity more regretful and convenable than that expressed by "" ("must"). Compared with "" ("I must go"), "" ("I mustn't not go") emphasizes that the situation is out of the speaker's hands and that the speaker has no choice in the matter: "Unfortunately, I have got to go". Similarly, "" or idiomatically "无人不知" ("There is no one who does not know") is a more emphatic way to express "Every single one knows".

A double negative almost always resolves to a positive meaning and even more so in colloquial speech where the speaker particularly stresses the first negative word. Meanwhile, a triple negative resolves to a negative meaning, which bares a stronger negativity than a single negative. For example, "" ("I do not think there is no one who does not know") ambiguously means either "I don't think everyone knows" or "I think someone does not know". A quadruple negative further resolves to a positive meaning embedded with stronger affirmation than a double negative; for example, "" ("It is not the case that I do not know that no one doesn't like him") means "I do know that everyone likes him". However, more than triple negatives are frequently perceived as obscure and rarely encountered.

Historical development 

Many languages, including all living Germanic languages, French, Welsh and some Berber and Arabic dialects, have gone through a process known as Jespersen's cycle, where an original negative particle is replaced by another, passing through an intermediate stage employing two particles (e.g. Old French  → Modern Standard French  → Modern Colloquial French  "I don't say").

In many cases, the original sense of the new negative particle is not negative per se (thus in French  "step", originally "not a step" = "not a bit"). Old English  "I didn't see" >> Middle English , lit. "I didn't see nothing" >> Early Modern English I saw not.

A similar development to a circumfix from double negation can be seen in non-Indo-European languages, too: for example, in Maltese,  "he ate" is negated as  "he did not eat", where the verb is preceded by a negative particle - "not" and followed by the particle -x, which was originally a shortened form of  "nothing" - thus, "he didn't eat nothing".

See also
 Affirmative and negative
 Agreement (linguistics)
 Idiom
 Jespersen's cycle
 List of common English usage misconceptions
 Litotes
 Negation
 Pleonasm
 Redundancy (linguistics)

References

Grammar
Nonstandard English grammar
Semantics
Ambiguity